"Cherish" is a pop song written by Terry Kirkman and recorded by the Association. Released in 1966, the song reached number one on the U.S. Billboard Hot 100 in September of that year and remained in the top position for three weeks. Billboard ranked the record as the No. 7 song of 1966, and later as No. 2, after a revision of the year-end charts. It was certified Gold by the RIAA in the US in 1966. In Canada, the song also reached number one.

Original version

Songwriting 
Terry Kirkman wrote it in half an hour and put it into the live act of his group, the Association.  He was looking for an emotional, slow tempo song in the same vein as the Righteous Brothers' "You've Lost That Lovin' Feelin'". Mike Whelan, from the New Christy Minstrels, liked it so much that he convinced the Minstrels to record a version of the song, and in fact their recording was almost released before the Association's.

In the lyrics, the protagonist tells his love interest that he "cherishes" her, though he isn't sure if he actually loves her or only wants her. At the same time he's unsure the love interest is interested in him, because she is being courted by "a thousand other guys".

Recording 
The instrumentation of their debut, which includes this song, was recorded at a converted garage studio owned by Gary S. Paxton, who engineered the sessions along with Pete Romano, while the vocals of the group were recorded at Columbia studios. Like most of Association hits, session musicians were called to do the instrumental track, including Mike Deasy on guitar, Jerry Scheff on bass and Jim Troxel on drums, with only Kirkman and Jules Alexander, as members of the band, participating on it. Curt Boettcher added some vocals, most notably the high-pitched "told you" and "hold you" on the final verse.

The song is notable for having two bridge sections, the second leading to a modulation in which the key rises a whole step. The song ends with the words "cherish is the word," over a sustained vibrato electric guitar chord.

For the single released, the song was speeded up and one of the two "And I do cherish you" lines near the end was removed. This was done to hold the track to the three-minute mark, as AM radio programmers frowned on songs that went longer than that. However, even with the edit, the song still ran over. Instead of editing further, producer Curt Boettcher intentionally listed "3:00" on the label as the song's running time.

Critical reception 
In a retrospective review published on Stereogum in 2018, Tom Breihan wrote, "There are things about 'Cherish' that should be good — things that look nice on paper. The Association were singing in lush, Beach Boys–esque harmonies, and they were doing it over intricately layered guitars and banjos and horns. But 'Cherish' is a bloodless affair, a sickly-sweet melody backing up a somewhat creepy lyric about fixating too hard on a girl." In his conclusion, he wrote, "Songs like this — vaguely queasy pop songs with lush and lightly orchestral arrangements — would pretty much dominate pop music for a few years in the early ’70s. The Association got there first, but they don’t get any points for it."

Conversely, Terry Watada states, "Cherish was wonderful, its sensual harmonies and simple sentiments produced the ideal dreamy atmosphere for a last dance."

Aftermath 
"Cherish" has become a staple in wedding ceremonies and slow dances, and is considered the 22nd most played song of the 20th Century by the BMI.

In 2012, original Association member Jim Yester said the record label claimed the song sounded "too old and archaic", but quipped that the song's success "just showed we can have archaic and eat it, too."

Personnel

The Association 

 Terry Kirkman – lead vocals
 Russ Giguere – harmony vocals
 Jules Alexander – backing vocals; possible lead guitar
 Jim Yester – backing vocals
Brian Cole – backing vocals   
Ted Bluechel – backing vocals

Session musicians and production staff 

 Mike Deasy, Lee Mallory, Ben Benay – guitars
 Jerry Scheff – bass guitar
 Doug Rhodes or Butch Parker – celesta
 Jim Henderson – piano
 Toxey French – vibraphone
 Jim Troxel – drums
 Curt Boettcher – backing vocals; producer
 Gary S. Paxton, Pete Romano – engineers

Charts

David Cassidy version

David Cassidy recorded his own version as a single in October 1971 which later appeared on  his album Cherish (1972). His version ended on the repeated phrase in the code: "And I do Cherish You", which fades out. His version reached number nine on the Hot 100 chart, and spent one week at number one on the Adult Contemporary chart. and peaked at number three in Canada and hit number one in both Australia and New Zealand. In the UK, it was issued as a double A-side with "Could It Be Forever", and peaked at number 2 in the UK Singles Chart. It was his debut hit single in that country. The song was certified Gold by the RIAA in the US in December 1971.

Charts

Other versions

Other artists to have covered the song include Dizzy Gillespie (The Melody Lingers On album), The Lettermen, Nina Simone, Ed Ames, Petula Clark (Colour My World album), Rita Wilson (AM/FM album), The Four Tops (Reach Out album), Carla Thomas (Love Means... album), Jodeci, Barry Manilow, Pat Metheny, Kenny Rogers and The First Edition, and Glee which incorporates elements from the Madonna song with the same title.

See also 
List of RPM number-one singles of 1966
List of Hot 100 number-one singles of 1966 (U.S.)
List of number-one adult contemporary singles of 1972 (U.S.)

References

External links
 

1966 singles
The Association songs
David Cassidy songs
Billboard Hot 100 number-one singles
Cashbox number-one singles
RPM Top Singles number-one singles
1966 songs
Valiant Records singles
Bell Records singles
Song recordings produced by Wes Farrell
Songs written by Terry Kirkman